This is a list of members of the ninth Australian Capital Territory Legislative Assembly, as elected at and subsequent to the October 2016 election.

 Kurrajong Liberal MLA Steve Doszpot died on 25 November 2017. He was replaced after a countback on 13 December 2017 by Candice Burch.
 Yerrabi Labor MLA Meegan Fitzharris resigned on 8 July 2019. She was replaced after a countback on 23 July 2019 by Deepak-Raj Gupta.

See also
2016 Australian Capital Territory general election

References

Members of Australian Capital Territory parliaments by term
21st-century Australian politicians